The 1903 Mississippi gubernatorial election took place on November 3, 1903, in order to elect the Governor of Mississippi. Incumbent Democrat Andrew H. Longino was term-limited, and could not run for reelection to a second term.

Democratic primary
The Democratic primary election was held on August 6, 1903, with the runoff held on August 27, 1903.

Results

General election
In the general election, Democratic candidate James K. Vardaman, a former state senator, ran unopposed.

Results

References

1903
gubernatorial
Mississippi